Lesa Lewis (born March 9, 1967) is an American professional female bodybuilder, nicknamed "Amazon".

Early life

Lesa Lewis was born in  Kansas City, Missouri, U.S. She grew up in a family with three brothers and three sisters. She ran track, played basketball, danced, and swam in high school. She attended University of Nebraska–Lincoln for a year, running the sprints- ,  meters, and the  relays. She left college to be a freelance modeling designer of clothing, hats, and shoes.

Bodybuilding career

Amateur

In 1992, Lesa began weight training. That year, she was training to get fit and toned at a Bally Total Fitness when a bodybuilder commented she had muscular legs and told her she should try bodybuilding. After that, she went into bodybuilding. In 1994, her coach became Tim Lutz. At the 1997 USA Championship, Lewis placed first in the heavyweight category and overall and won her IFBB pro card.

Professional

At the 1998 Ms. International, Lewis placed second at the competition. However, a week after the contest, when the results of the mandatory diuretic tests were declared, she, along with Gayle Moher and Denise Masino, were found to have tested positive and were disqualified from the contest.

Contest history

 1992 Missouri State Championships - 2nd
 1993 Missouri State Championships - 1st
 1994 Heart of America - 1st
 1995 Red River Classic - 1st 
 1996 Lone Star Classic - 1st
 1996 NPC Junior Nationals - 1st (HW)
 1996 NPC Nationals - 4th (HW)
 1997 NPC USA Championship - 1st (HW and overall)
 1997 IFBB Jan Tana Classic - 5th
 1998 IFBB Ms. International - 2nd (disqualified)
 1998 IFBB Jan Tana Classic - 1st
 1998 IFBB Ms. Olympia - 4th
 1999 IFBB Ms. International - 2nd
 1999 IFBB Ms. Olympia - 5th
 2000 IFBB Ms. International - 5th (HW)
 2000 IFBB Ms. Olympia - 3rd (HW)
 2001 IFBB Ms. International - 3rd (HW)
 2001 IFBB Ms. Olympia - 5th (HW)
 2002 IFBB GNC Show of Strength - 5th (HW)

Personal life

Television appearance
Lewis appeared in the 2000 documentary film Bodybuilders.

References

1967 births
African-American female bodybuilders
Living people
Professional bodybuilders
Sportspeople from Kansas City, Missouri
21st-century African-American people
21st-century African-American women
20th-century African-American sportspeople
20th-century African-American women